DigiTour Media was a touring  and social media festival production company, known for producing the world's first social media tour. DigiTour events are held in venues such as theaters, amphitheaters, and parking lots or fields upon which the stages and other structures are erected. The tour began as a showcase for social media stars from YouTube, but its roster of performers has now expanded to include Vine, Twitter, and Instagram stars as well as traditional pop music stars.

Overview
DigiTour Media produces live events and unique content that features some of the most popular acts on YouTube.  DigiFest NYC, a full-day festival property owned by DigiTour, is typically held on the first Saturday of June in New York City. Many of the acts at DigiTour events do not get their music played on the radio yet continually sell out DigiTour's multiple events with their tens of millions of fans.

DigiTour has secured multiple brand sponsorships from companies such as Intel, Google, Sony, and Gibson. On May 15, 2014, the company announced strategic investments from Ryan Seacrest and Advance Publications, parent company of Conde Nast.

History
DigiTour Media was founded in 2010 by music executive Meridith Valiando Rojas and multi-platinum music producer Christopher Rojas. DigiTour has produced over 70 events as of 2013, including all-day festivals, which feature 40–80 artists, as well as month-long tours.

The first DigiTour took place in 2011 and was sponsored by YouTube. The 27-city tour began with a multi-camera livestream at the Google Headquarters in Mountainview, California, on April 8, 2011. Top musician Britney Spears attended the opening night of the tour at the El Rey Theater.

The second DigiTour took place in 2012 and traveled to 18 cities including Los Angeles, Las Vegas, Orlando, Toronto, and New York City.

The first DigiFest took place on June 1, 2013, at Terminal 5 in New York City and was headlined by Pentatonix and Allstar Weekend. 
DigiTour 2013 showcased the most popular British YouTube personalities. Over 11,000 fans attended shows in Chicago, Toronto, Philadelphia, and New York.

DigiFest LA took place on December 14, 2013, and was dubbed the largest YouTube music festival by Just Jared. The event featured over 50 performances and was headlined by rapper Hoodie Allen. Teen actors Bella Thorne, Madison Pettis, Blake Michael, and Jake Short also made on-stage appearances, with James Maslow of Big Time Rush and Darren Criss of Glee in attendance.

Nearly 100,000 fans attended DigiTour events in the United States, Canada, and Europe in 2014. The company and Disney Music Group formed in June 2017 RMI Recordings, a new label for "digital-first" talent.

Notable performers
Notable DigiTour and DigiFest entertainers include:

 Dylan Dauzat
 Christina Grimmie
 Aaron Carpenter
 Demi Lovato
 Blake Michael
 Jasmine Villegas
 Midnight Red
 Before You Exit
 Megan and Liz
 Action Item
 Jake Short
 Marcus Butler
 Twaimz
 Nash Grier
 Andrea Russett
 Kaleb Nation
 Andrew Lowe
 Sawyer Hartman
 Lohanthony
 Jennxpenn
 Luke Korns
 Jackson Guthy
 Poppy
 Crawford Collins
 Sam Pottorff
 Weekly Chris
 Paul Zimmer
 Danny Edge
 Tanya Burr
 Luke Conard
 Caspar Lee
 Jim Chapman
 PointlessBlog
 Pentatonix
 GloZell
 Tyler Ward
 Improv Everywhere
 Allstar Weekend
 Keenan Cahill
 Steve Kardynal
 Kina Grannis
 Savannah Outen
 The Gregory Brothers
 Dave Days
 Rebecca Black
 Antoine Dodson
 Nick Pitera
 Joey Graceffa
 Fifth Harmony
 Troye Sivan
 Noah Cyrus
 Hoodie Allen
 Bella Thorne
 Jacob Sartorius
 Tyler Oakley
 Forever in Your Mind
 Reed Deming
 Chase Goehring
 Madliyn Bailey
 Jacob Whitesides
 Heffron Drive
 Brent Rivera
 Ryan Beatty
 Cody Johns
 The Janoskians
 Lia Marie Johnson
 Elijah Daniel
 Jacksfilms
 Al Calderon
 Jack & Jack
 Oli White
 Bea Miller
 Thatsojack
 Cimorelli
 Karmin
 Madison Pettis
 Cameron Dallas
 Loren Gray
 Nathan Triska
 Sophia Kameron
 Blake Gray
 Luna Blaise
 Raegan Beast
 Jonah Marais

References

External links
 
Digi Media

Rock festivals in the United States
Concert tours